The 2002 Canoe Slalom World Cup was a series of five races in 4 canoeing and kayaking categories organized by the International Canoe Federation (ICF). It was the 15th edition. The series consisted of 4 regular world cup races and the world cup final.

Calendar

Final standings 

The winner of each world cup race was awarded 30 points. Semifinalists were guaranteed at least 5 points and paddlers eliminated in heats received 2 points each. The world cup final points scale was multiplied by a factor of 1.5. That meant the winner of the world cup final earned 45 points, semifinalists got at least 7.5 points and paddlers eliminated in heats received 3 points apiece. Only the best four results of each athlete counted for the final world cup standings.

Results

World Cup Race 1 

The first world cup race of the season took place in Guangzhou, China from 25 to 26 May.

World Cup Race 2 

The second world cup race of the season took place at the Augsburg Eiskanal, Germany from 19 to 21 July.

World Cup Race 3 

The third world cup race of the season took place at the Tacen Whitewater Course, Slovenia from 27 to 28 July.

World Cup Race 4 

The fourth world cup race of the season took place at the Prague-Troja Canoeing Centre, Czech Republic from 3 to 4 August.

World Cup Final 

The final world cup race of the season took place in Tibagi, Brazil from 13 to 15 September.

References

External links 
International Canoe Federation

Canoe Slalom World Cup
Canoe Slalom World Cup